Dmitri or Dmytro Valentynovych Shkidchenko ( or Шкидченко; died 26 January 2023) was a Ukrainian figure skating coach and pair skater who competed internationally for the Soviet Union. With his skating partner Irina Mironenko, he was the 1985 and 1986 World Junior silver medalist.

Personal life
Shkidchenko was married to Anastasia Makarova, the general secretary of the Ukrainian Figure Skating Federation. He died on 26 January 2023.

Career
Shkidchenko competed in partnership with Irina Mironenko for the Soviet Union. In November 1984, the pair won gold at the 1984 Blue Swords in East Germany. A month later, in December 1984, the pair won silver at the 1985 World Junior Championships in Colorado Springs, Colorado, where they finished second to Ekaterina Gordeeva / Sergei Grinkov.

In December 1985, Mironenko/Shkidchenko were awarded silver at the 1986 World Junior Championships in Sarajevo. They were second to Elena Leonova / Gennadi Krasnitski.

After retiring from competition, Shkidchenko coached the following skaters:
 Ivan Pavlov
 Alina Dikhtiar / Filip Zalevski
 Julia Beloglazova / Andrei Bekh
 Julia Obertas / Dmitri Palamarchuk
 Tatiana Chuvaeva / Dmitri Palamarchuk
 Julia Lavrentieva / Yuri Rudyk
 Kyrylo Marsak

Results 
(with Mironenko)

References

20th-century births
2023 deaths
Soviet male pair skaters
Ukrainian figure skating coaches
Ukrainian male pair skaters
World Junior Figure Skating Championships medalists
Year of birth missing